Ottavio Briccola was an Italian general. He was the first Italian governor of Cyrenaica after he had participated in the Italo-Turkish War.

At the beginning of World War I he commanded the 8th corps of the Italian fifth army.

Notes

1853 births
1924 deaths
Military personnel from Turin
Italian colonial governors and administrators
Italian military personnel of the Italo-Turkish War
Italian military personnel of World War I
Italian generals
Grand Officers of the Military Order of Savoy